Street luge is an extreme gravity-powered activity that involves riding a street luge board (sometimes referred to as a sled) down a paved road or course. Street luge is also known as land luge or road luge. Like skateboarding, street luge is often done for sport and for recreation.

Other than the supine riding position and very high speeds (70–102 mph / 112–164 km/h), street luge has little relation to its winter namesake (luge).

History
Street luge was born in Southern California as downhill skateboarders found they could reach faster speeds by lying down on their skateboards. This early form of the sport is now referred to as "laydown skateboarding".

In 1975, the first professional race was held at Signal Hill, California, and hosted by the U.S. Skateboard Association. The race winner was based on top speed. The boards used in this race varied from basic skateboards to complex skate cars in which the rider was completely enclosed by plastic or fiberglass. The sport was not commonly referred to as street luge at this time but the term luge was used to describe some participants' riding position. Most contestants were standing up; however, an opening in the rules enabled riders to choose their own board position, including supine. By 1978, repeated injuries to both riders and spectators halted the races at Signal Hill.

Roger Hickey and Don Baumea from the Signal Hill races kept the sport alive by continuing to hold races in Southern California. Around the early 1990s, both underground and professional races continued to be held in Southern California by such organizations as the Underground Racers Association (URA), Federation of International Gravity Racing (FIGR) and Road Racers Association for International Luge (RAIL). Race organizers in the 1980s and 1990s started implementing many more equipment, safety and race regulations.

Meanwhile, in the early 1990s, some Austrian skateboarders started sitting down on their skateboards on the way back from teaching skiing in the Alps. This activity lead to a classic style street luge race in the Kaunertal Valley, in western Austria, called Hot Heels. At the outset, the founders started lying down on wooden boards closer to large skateboards than the usual street luge, and with smaller wheels: this came to be known as classic luge, or buttboard. The race, which ran until 2003, came to function as a de facto world championships, including all the downhill disciplines such as street luge, stand up downhill skateboard, classic luge, gravity biking and inline skating.  There is now a healthy street luge riding and racing presence in many European countries (see below).

In the mid 1990s, ESPN’s X Games showcased street luge to the world and the sport was originally sanctioned by RAIL, then by the International Gravity Sports Association (IGSA). NBC followed ESPN’s lead and created the Gravity Games in which the sport was sanctioned by Extreme Downhill International (EDI). Smaller events were also held in Canada, South Africa, Australia, Switzerland, Germany, Sweden and the U.K. Qualification criteria for these events varied and were controlled by each of the sanctioning bodies.

After a media splurge through the late 1990s and early 2000s, extreme sports like street luge have taken a lower profile. The X Games has become more stadium-based for commercial reasons. Others, such as the Gravity Games, Hot Heels and the Australian Xtreme Games, have disappeared.

While no longer a sport in either the X Games or Gravity Games, street luge is a burgeoning sport in numerous countries with competitions around the globe. There are approximately 1200 active street luge riders in the world.

World record
On September 10, 2016, Mike McIntyre went 164.12 km/h (101.98 mph) at l'Ultime Descente.

Champions
Source

Equipment, safety and racing

Street lugers ride boards in the supine position.  The design of these boards is based on the rules set forth from different governing bodies.  Consistent design elements include:
 The use of lean-activated steering skateboard-style trucks
 The prohibited use of mechanical brakes
 Front and rear padding
 Length, width and weight restrictions - details depend on sanctioning body
 The prohibited use of parts that enclose the rider’s body or hinder braking

Current street luge boards are made from many materials including steel, aluminum, wood, and carbon fibre. The majority of the street luge boards in the world are custom made although commercial models are now available.  Actual board designs can vary as the construction rules are very open and allow for numerous design considerations.

An offshoot of street luge is classic luge.  With more regulations and limits to construction and equipment it was designed to be a simpler, low cost class as compared to street luge.  Classic Luge boards are typically made from wood, are limited to maximum dimensions of 49 inches by 12 inches (124 cm by 30 cm) and may only have four wheels.  Maximum wheels diameter may also be restricted depending on the sanctioning body and race organizer.

Riders participating in sanctioned racing events are required to wear safety equipment including:
 Hard-shell helmet with chin strap and face shield or goggles
 Leather or Kevlar racing suit
 Leather or Kevlar gloves
 Sturdy Shoes

Race courses are usually held on mountain roads but have been held on city streets as well. Courses can range in length from 0.5 to 3 miles (1 to 5 km) and vary in layout (number and severity of turns).  Racing can take the following formats:
 Single elimination with 2, 4, or 6 racers at a time
 Double elimination with 2, 4, or 6 racers at a time
 Timed trials
 No elimination points system (points for each finishing position in several heats)
 Mass runs, with up to 20 racers at a time (positions are decided by the order they cross the finish line)

Governing bodies
There are currently two worldwide governing bodies for street luge, the International Gravity Sports Association (IGSA) and the International Downhill Federation (IDF).

The ruling body for street luge during the 1997–2001 X Games was the IGSA.

Notes

References
Kahn, Jeremy (1981–). Street Luge 101. Kahn Productions. (DVD) 2003
Lott, Darren (1961–). Street Luge Survival Guide (1st ed.). Gravity Publishing. 1998 
Nichols, John (1966–). Street Luge. Raintree Steck-Vaughn. 2002

External links

Street-luge.com street luge online forum
 International Gravity Sports Association
 International Downhill Federation
 Street Luge PDX
 GravityDB.com Gravity Sports Database
Gravity Sport University
video of street luge by Yvon Labarthe (World series champion 2009)
Street Luge video collection
 Frank Williams

Boardsports
Racing
Sports originating in the United States